Eric J. Chaisson (pronounced chase-on, born on October 26, 1946 in Lowell, Massachusetts) is an American astrophysicist known for his research, teaching, and writing on the interdisciplinary science of cosmic evolution. He is a member of the Center for Astrophysics  Harvard & Smithsonian, teaches natural science at Harvard University and is an elected Fellow of the American Association for the Advancement of Science.

He has published telescopic observations of interstellar clouds and nebulae as well as the supermassive black hole at the center of the Milky Way Galaxy. He studies complexity science utilizing the technical concept of energy rate density,  quantifies waste heating effects on climate change, explores astrobiology and life in the Universe, seeks to unify natural science and works to improve science education nationally and internationally.

Biography 
Chaisson graduated in physics from University of Massachusetts Lowell in 1968 and earned his PhD at Harvard in 1972.  He has held professorial appointments at the Center for Astrophysics  Harvard & Smithsonian, Johns Hopkins University, Space Telescope Science Institute, and Tufts University, where he was for 20 years director of the Wright Center for Science Education while holding research professorships in the department of physics and in the school of education.  He is now back at the Harvard College Observatory where, in semi-retirement, he teaches one course each year and works with colleagues at the allied Smithsonian Astrophysical Observatory.

He was commissioned an officer in the U.S. Air Force at Lackland Air Force Base in 1970, serving on active duty and in the reserves until 1986, after which he was honorably discharged at the rank of captain. He took leave from academia in 1986 at MIT Lincoln Laboratory as staff physicist working on ballistic missile defense amidst occasional consulting and advising for many years with the military-intelligence community. He spent sabbaticals in 1996 as visiting scholar and national lecturer for Phi Beta Kappa and in 2018 working on solar energy as visiting professor at University of Notre Dame and Distinguished Fellow at its Institute for Advanced Study.

Awards

Chaisson’s research and writing have won several awards, such as the 1977 B.J. Bok Prize  for “original radio-astronomy discoveries,” the 1980 Smith-Weld Prize for “best article by a Harvard faculty member,” a certificate of recognition from NASA with U.S. flag flown aboard the STS-31 mission for “contributions made to the Hubble Space Telescope program,” as well as unsought fellowships from the Sloan Foundation and the National Academy of Sciences.

His book Cosmic Dawn in 1982 received the Phi Beta Kappa Award in Science, the Science Writing Award of the American Institute of Physics and was a finalist for the National Book Award for Nonfiction.  The Hubble Wars in 1995 also won the AIP’s Science Writing Award and was listed in the "best books of the year" category by the New York Times. Epic of Evolution won the 2007 Kistler Book Award “for “increasing understanding of factors shaping the future of humanity.”  And the textbook, Astronomy: The Universe at a Glance, won the Most Innovative New Textbook award in 2016 from the Textbook Authors Association.

Bibliography
 Cosmic Dawn: The Origins of Matter and Life (in 9 foreign languages), Atlantic Monthly Press, 1981
 The Invisible Universe: Probing Frontiers of Astrophysics (co-authored with G. Field; in 4 languages), Birkhauser-Boston, 1985
 The Life Era: Cosmic Selection and Conscious Evolution, Atlantic Monthly Press, 1987
 Relatively Speaking: Black Holes, Relativity, and Fate of the Universe (in five languages), Norton, 1988
 Universe: An Evolutionary Approach to Astronomy, Prentice-Hall, 1988
 Astronomy Today (co-authored with S. McMillan), Pearson, 9 editions, 1993-2018
 Astronomy: A Beginner’s Guide, (co-authored with S. McMillan), Pearson, 8 editions, 1995-2017
 The Hubble Wars: Astrophysics Meets Astropolitics . . ., HarperCollins, 1994
 The 13th Labor: Improving Science Education (co-edited with T-C. Kim), Gordon&Breach, 1999
 Cosmic Evolution: The Rise of Complexity in Nature, Harvard University Press, 2001
 Epic of Evolution: Seven Ages of the Cosmos (in 7 languages), Columbia University Press, 2006
 Astronomy: The Universe at a Glance (co-authored with S. McMillan), Pearson, 2016

See also
 Big History
 Epic of Evolution

References

External links
Eric Chaisson's curriculum vitae
 Eric Chaisson's web site
 Cosmic evolution web site (containing text, images, animations, movies, and hyperlinked references of interest to both non-scientists {Introductory Track} and professional scientists {Advanced Track}).
 A 60-minute video interview with PBS-Science for the Public 2014: WGBH Forum
 Representative samples of recent research articles: Current Research
 Syllabus of annual course at Harvard: Current Teaching

American astrophysicists
American educators
Harvard University alumni
Living people
American science writers
Harvard College Observatory people
1946 births
People from Lowell, Massachusetts
Tufts University faculty